Bedull may refer to:

Bedollo or Bedull
Richard Bedull, MP